Daniel de Oliveira (born 20 June 1931) is a Portuguese chess player, Portuguese Chess Championship winner (1953).

Biography
In the 1950s and 1960s Daniel de Oliveira was one of Portugal's leading chess players. He won Portuguese Chess Championship in 1953.

Daniel De Oliveira played for Portugal in the Chess Olympiad:
 In 1960, at fourth board in the 14th Chess Olympiad in Leipzig (+7, =6, -4).

References

External links

Daniel De Oliveira chess games at 365chess.com

1931 births
Living people
Portuguese chess players
Chess Olympiad competitors
20th-century chess players